Anna Forbes Liddell (December 6, 1891 — August 30, 1979) was an American academic and feminist, active in the suffrage movement in North Carolina as a young woman, and a Robert O. Lawton Distinguished Professor of Philosophy at Florida State University.

Early life and education
Anna Forbes Liddell was born in Charlotte, North Carolina, the daughter of Walter Scott Liddell, a manufacturer, and Helen Sherman Ogden Liddell. She was a student at Queens University of Charlotte (then called Presbyterian Female College), then briefly at University of Tennessee and Columbia University as a young woman. In 1918, she completed undergraduate studies at the University of North Carolina at Chapel Hill, where she studied philosophy with Henry Horace Williams. In 1922, she earned a master's degree at Cornell University, and in 1924 she was one of the first two women to finish a Ph.D. at the University of North Carolina (the other was Irene Dillard Elliott). Her dissertation was titled "The Logical Relationship of the Philosophy of Hegel to the Philosophies of Spinoza and Kant." She pursued some post-doctoral education at the University of Heidelberg.

Career
During her college years, Liddell wrote for magazines and newspapers, and worked in advertising and publishing.  In 1913, Forbes Liddell and Susanne Bynum organized the North Carolina Equal Suffrage League. Between college and graduate school, she taught school in North Carolina.

After earning her Ph.D., Liddell was first on the faculty at Chowan College as a professor of social studies. In 1926, she began teaching at the Florida State College for Women, and stayed as it became Florida State University in 1947, until she retired in 1962. She headed the Department of Philosophy and Religion, and was selected as the Robert O. Lawton Distinguished Professor of the Year at Florida State, in 1959. She was the first Southern woman philosopher on the program at the International Congress of Philosophy when it was held in Prague in 1934. She was the first professor at her university to teach a course on closed circuit television. In 1932, she was elected president of the Southern Society of Philosophy and Psychology.

In the 1970s, in her eighties and using a wheelchair, Liddell testified for the Equal Rights Amendment in the Florida House of Representatives.

Personal life
Liddell died in 1979, aged 87 years. A small collection of her papers is archived at Florida State University.

References

1891 births
1979 deaths
Florida State University faculty
Writers from Charlotte, North Carolina
American suffragists
Cornell University alumni
American feminists
20th-century American women writers
Activists from North Carolina
American women academics